These are the results for the 37th edition of the Ronde van Nederland cycling race, which was held from August 26 to August 30, 1997. The race started in Tilburg (North Brabant) and finished after 895.7 kilometres in Landgraaf (Limburg).

Stages

26-08-1997: Tilburg-Alkmaar, 199 km

27-08-1997: Alkmaar-Haarlem, 168 km

28-08-1997: Hoogeveen-Denekamp, 91 km

28-08-1997: Nordhorn-Denekamp (Time Trial), 23 km

29-08-1997: Almelo-Venray, 178 km

30-08-1997: Venray-Landgraaf, 236 km

Final classification

External links
Wielersite Results

Ronde van Nederland
1997 in road cycling
Ronde